Liisa Suihkonen (born 27 September 1943) is a former cross-country skier from Finland who competed during the 1970s. She was born in Suonenjoki, Northern Savonia.

She won a silver medal in the 4 × 5 km relay at the 1976 Winter Olympics of Innsbruck.

Cross-country skiing results

Olympic Games
 1 medal – (1 silver)

World Championships

References

External links
Women's cross country results: 1952-2006

1943 births
Living people
People from Suonenjoki
Finnish female cross-country skiers
Olympic cross-country skiers of Finland
Cross-country skiers at the 1968 Winter Olympics
Cross-country skiers at the 1976 Winter Olympics
Olympic silver medalists for Finland
Olympic medalists in cross-country skiing
Medalists at the 1976 Winter Olympics
Sportspeople from North Savo
20th-century Finnish women